The Ford Mondeo Mk IV (third generation), codenamed CD345 was officially unveiled in five-door production form by Ford in late 2006. Based on the EUCD platform developed with Volvo, the platform was the same as that used in the new large MPVs Galaxy and S-MAX, but not the North American Ford Fusion or the Mazda Atenza in Japan. It was also used for several Volvos starting with the Volvo S80 II.

History 

The Mk IV Ford Mondeo was released in May 2007 in the United Kingdom, where it was available in five different trim levels: Edge, Zetec, Ghia, Titanium and Titanium X. In February 2008, Ford announced that in some European markets the Mondeo will be made available with a new Titanium X Sport trim. This model aims to add an even more 'sporty character' than the current Titanium series. In March 2008, a new 2.2  TDCi common-rail diesel engine will be available on Mondeo providing acceleration to 0- in 8.4 seconds on the saloon and fuel consumption of returning 45.6 mpg combined (this engine was replaced with the 2.0l TDCi 163 returning a combined 53.3mpg imp gallons, with a marginal loss of performance). In March 2008, a new Mondeo ECOnetic based on the Zetec series was released. The Mondeo ECOnetic is powered with a 1.6  TDCI diesel that returns CO2 ratings of just 139 g/km on the 5-door.

Although the fourth production model, after the Mk III Galaxy, S-Max and C-Max, to adopt Ford's current 'kinetic' design language, the Mondeo's design theme was first shown as the Ford Iosis concept at the 2005 Frankfurt Motor Show, which gave an indication to the look of the Mk IV Mondeo. The new car, in estate bodystyle, was pre-launched in 'concept' form at the Paris Motor Show on 30 September 2006.

The new platform allowed for the use of Volvo's five-cylinder petrol engine, already featured in the Focus ST and S-Max. Also, Ford dropped the two V6 engines for this platform. It was initially believed performance models may have featured engines from Jaguar and Volvo, but following Tata's purchase of Jaguar/Land Rover, performance variants are more likely to feature other 'in-house' Ford engines such as an uprated 2.5l T5 petrol (as found in the Focus RS) or Volvo's D5 diesel and Mazda's 2.3l petrol.

The new Mondeo uses the new electro-hydraulic steering system, first used on the C-Max, that sharpens the steering response, and helps to save fuel Inside, the Mk IV features Ford's Human-Machine Interface (HMI) first seen on the Galaxy and S-Max whilst an enhanced instrument cluster featuring a  LCD for displaying trip computer and satellite navigation is available as an option on all models. Like the facelift Mk IV, base specification models have a manual heating/air-conditioning system in place of the climate control system. Also new on the Mk IV is the option of keyless starting of the engine via a "Ford Power" button on the dashboard.

A product placement promotional initiative made the Mk IV Mondeo James Bond's car for one incidental scene in Casino Royale, introducing the new model to global audiences in November 2006, on the launch day of the movie.

As with the previous model, the Mk IV Mondeo was not marketed in the United States or Canada because Ford sold the same-class Fusion, which was launched in 2005. The new Mondeo was not sold in Venezuela, Brazil or Colombia because the Fusion is sold locally, nor is it offered in Mexico, although the Mk IV model was popular there. It was, however, sold in Argentina. In Middle East and Central America, it was sold along with the Ford Fusion until 2013, when the fifth Mondeo was introduced. It was not even sold in South Africa because Ford South Africa did not want to sell it after the MK II Mondeo went out of production, which meant that the Ford Fusion became sold in South Africa in 2015. thus replacing the Mondeo altogether.

The 2007 Mondeo marked the return to the Australian market after a six-year absence, due to a resurgence in popularity of medium-sized cars in the last few years. This is in no small part the result of high fuel prices making people reconsider purchasing large cars like the Ford Falcon. Marketing for the Mondeo in Australia focused on the theme that the Mark IV Mondeo looks good but offers even more than style, with television commercials showing silly quotes from celebrities such as Britney Spears ("I've been to lots of overseas places... like Canada") interspersed with scenes of the vehicle and finally the slogan "more than just good looks".

Initial sales have been good in Australia, despite supply constraints from Europe limiting the car's success there. The Mondeo was initially sold as a sedan and liftback body styles in the Australian market, with diesel or petrol engines, and in four trim levels: LX, TDCi, Zetec and XR5 Turbo. In June 2009, Ford Australia announced that the 'Titanium' badge would also be used on Australian spec Mondeos, along with the release of the Mk IV Mondeo station wagon. Only the 2.3L petrol, 2.5L petrol and 2.0L diesel engines were offered there, the 2.5 being the only model available with a manual transmission. The ECOnetic Mondeo was also considered for the Australian market, but was never launched.

Facelift
In September 2010, a mid-cycle facelifted Mk IV Mondeo was introduced with some changes, such as the new ecoboost engines and LED daytime running lights. The final changes were shown at the 2010 Moscow International Motor Show. The front and rear of the car had minor changes, the biggest being the new Kinetic Design. The interior was improved, with a use of better materials.

The Ghia trim line was removed in the United Kingdom, so the Titanium takes over as the top of the range models, along with the saloon. The new econetic has higher mpg and further reduced CO2 emissions thanks to Stop-Start technology. Also introduced is an improved version of the 2.2L PSA diesel engine, delivering a healthy 200PS. This facelift is prompted by similar revisions to the S-MAX, which was launched in August 2010.

Trim levels

The Irish range has the following trim levels:

Style
ECOnetic
Zetec
Titanium X
Titanium X Sport

The Norwegian range has the following trim levels:

Trend
ECOnetic
Ghia (discontinued 2010)
Titanium
Titanium X
Titanium S
Premium

Features
The Mk IV Mondeo hosted features such as:

Human Machine Interface: A system so advanced it could present all features within the car being triggered with voice activation. (Only available on Zetec and higher spec)
Blind Spot Monitoring: The Mk IV Mondeo could detect cars coming within the drivers blind spot areas, avoiding such issues.
Active Cruise Control: The Mk IV Mondeo could detect vehicles coming ahead, slowing the car down to a desired safety to not cause any harm to any road users.
Navigation: The Mk IV Mondeo featured a Blaupunkt-based NX System, though not quick it was vastly packed with features.

Sales
Despite positive reviews from the motoring media right up to the final year of production, this generation of Mondeo has not been a strong seller in the United Kingdom, falling out of Top 10 Best Selling Cars In Britain in 2010, when just over 30,000 were sold, and plummeting to just over 16,000 sales in 2013, and less than 7,000 during 2014. In 2009, it was outsold by its main rival, the Vauxhall Insignia.

This placed it well short of competitors, like the BMW 3 Series, Mercedes-Benz C-Class, and Vauxhall Insignia. This in stark contrast to the 1990s, when sales of the original Mondeo topped 100,000 per year, and even the second generation model peaked at more than 80,000 in 2001. It was still selling above 50,000 units per year in 2005. However, the popularity of more expensive versions of the Focus, the Kuga SUV and the related S-MAX have minimized the impact of the Mondeo's fall in popularity on overall Ford sales.

Awards
2007 Auto Express Car of the Year (Auto Express quoted the Mondeo is: "Ford's finest ever car")
2007 Auto Express Best Family Car
2007 Fifth Gear: Best Family Newcomer
2007 Top Gear Car of the Year (Joint COTY, Subaru Legacy Outback)
2007 RACV: Best Mid–Size Car Over $28,000
2007 Drive Car of the Year: Best Medium Car
2008 Semperit Irish Car of the Year
2008 What Car? Best Estate Car
2008 What Car? Best Family Car
2008 Motor Trend: Top 10 Car
2008 Car and Driver: 10 Best Car
2008 Car News Magazine (Taiwan): Best Domestic Large Sedan
2008 Sina: Best Driving Performance Car
2008 Drive Car of the Year: Best Medium Car
2008 The Caravan Club: Tow Car of the Year (Mondeo 2.5t Estate)
2008 Auto Express Best Family Car
2009 What Car? Best Estate Car
2009 What Car? Best Family Car
2009 New Zealand Automobile Association: Best Medium Car
2010 Drive Car of the Year: Best Medium Car
2011 What Car? Best Estate Car
2011 What Car? Best Family Car
2012 What Car? Best Estate Car
2012 What Car? Best Family Car
2012 Now Magazine: "Most Attractive Car For A Man To Drive"
2013 What Car? Best Estate Car 
2013 What Car? Best Family Car

References

External links

3rd
Euro NCAP large family cars
Front-wheel-drive vehicles
All-wheel-drive vehicles
Hatchbacks
Sedans
Station wagons
Cars introduced in 2007
2010s cars